KACT may refer to:

 KACT (AM), a radio station (1360 AM) licensed to Andrews, Texas, United States
 KACT-FM, a radio station (105.5 FM) licensed to Andrews, Texas, United States
 the ICAO code for Waco Regional Airport